Frank Roberts (22 January 1882–26 June 1963) was a New Zealand pioneer in building model railways. His models were extremely accurate and reflected the history of the New Zealand railways.

Early career
Roberts spent his early career working for New Zealand Railways Department (NZR) as a cleaner, fireman and driver before becoming a partner in an electrical firm with his brother Jack. In 1903 Roberts built his first model which was of the WA class steam locomotive using a scale of 1:19. 

In 1926 Roberts joined the Auckland Model Engineering Society and began building his first garden railway. Using 1¾ inch gauge track, Roberts, his brother George and W. W. Stewart built a large railway (known as the "RSR Railway") over the next 50 years at Roberts home in Epsom, Auckland. Roberts built his models from then on to a scale of 1:24 (G scale). His meticulously accurate working models of examples of the locomotives and rolling stock found on New Zealand railways became a local attraction. The popularity of this layout led to Roberts being commissioned in 1938 by NZR to build and operate a working model train layout for the New Zealand Centennial Exhibition.

New Zealand Centennial Exhibition
Roberts' work for the New Zealand Centennial Exhibition (1939-1940) showed him at the peak of his expertise. The NZR section of the exhibition was extremely popular.

Preservation
Roberts sold his models to the Railways Department in 1950 and was employed by them to maintain them as working models. In June 1993, just prior to privatisation, New Zealand Rail Limited gifted the collection to the Museum of New Zealand Te Papa Tongarewa.

External links 
Models by Frank Roberts from the collection of the Museum of New Zealand Te Papa Tongarewa
 Film Letting off Steam Working models of railway locomotives at a model engineering society's field-day and children at an exhibition of N.Z.R. models. Held by Archives New Zealand. Ref: R.V.132
 Film Weekly Review No. 379 (1948) Auckland Garden Railway. Held by Archives New Zealand. Ref: R.V. 689

References

Citations

Bibliography
 
 Vintage Steam - Stories by Frank Roberts, Edited by Frank Roberts and Gordon Troup, 1967

1882 births
1963 deaths
Rail transport modellers
New Zealand people in rail transport
20th-century New Zealand engineers